The Miss Perú 1988 pageant was held on April 27, 1988. That year, 20 candidates were competing for the national crown. The chosen winners represented Peru at the Miss Universe 1988 and Miss World 1988. The rest of the finalists would enter in different pageants.

Placements

Special Awards

 Best Regional Costume - Puno - Monica Rengifo
 Miss Photogenic - Loreto - Nuria Piug Raygada
 Miss Elegance - Amazonas - Martha Sofía Salazar
 Miss Body - Piura - Susan León
 Best Hair - La Libertad - Katia Escudero
 Miss Congeniality - Region Lima - Silvana Ferrari
 Most Beautiful Face - Amazonas - Martha Sofía Salazar

.

Delegates

Amazonas - Martha Sofía Salazar
Arequipa - Guadalupe Rojas
Cajamarca - Yesenia Castillo
Callao - Teresa Jimenez
Cuzco - Milagros Velazco
Distrito Capital - Martha Elena Kaik
Huancavelica - Ursula Leyva
Huánuco - Erika Lantos
Ica - Myra Cabrera
Junín - Marcela Rizzo

La Libertad - Katia Escudero
Loreto - Nuria Piug
Madre de Dios - Judith Amado Dueñas
Piura - Susan León Cavassa
Puno - Monica Rengifo
Region Lima - Silvana Ferrari 
San Martín - Charito Gomez
Tacna - Lourdes Escaffe
Ucayali - Pierina Sarria Fasce
USA Peru - Stephanie Klinge 

.

Trivia 

 Silvana Ferrari is sister of Miss Peru 1984 Fiorella Ferrari.
 Nuria Piug went to Miss Wonderland the following year where placed 1st Runner-Up, and 7 years later crowned Mrs. Peru 1995.

References 

Miss Peru
1988 in Peru
1988 beauty pageants